Benjamin Daimary (born 28 July 2000) is the first openly gay Indian actor to win a national film award. He got the Jury's special award for his role in the Assamese film Jonaki Porua (Fireflies) in 2021. He also received the best actor award at the Asian Queer Film Festival in 2020.

Benjamin was born in Goreswar town of Baksa district, Assam. Parallel to Acting, he is working as a make up artist in Assamese fashion industry.

Early life
Benjamin Daimary was born in Goreswar in Assam.

Personal life 
He is openly gay and his family is supportive of him.

References 

Assamese actors
Indian gay actors
Indian gay artists
Living people
Actors from Assam
2000 births
21st-century Indian LGBT people